Sikanderpur is a constituency of the Uttar Pradesh Legislative Assembly covering the city of Sikanderpur in the Ballia district of Uttar Pradesh, India.

Sikanderpur is one of five assembly constituencies in the Salempur Lok Sabha constituency. Since 2008, this assembly constituency is numbered 359 amongst 403 constituencies.

Election results

2022

2017
Bharatiya Janta Party candidate Sanjay Yadav won in last Assembly election of 2017 Uttar Pradesh Legislative Elections defeating Samajwadi Party candidate Mohammed Ziauddin Rizvi by a margin of 23,548 votes.

Members of Legislative Assembly

References

External links
 

Assembly constituencies of Uttar Pradesh